Lewisia nevadensis is a species of flowering plant in the family Montiaceae known by the common name Nevada lewisia. It is native to much of the western United States, where it grows in moist mountain habitat, such as meadows. This is a small perennial herb growing from a taproot and caudex unit. It produces a basal rosette of several narrow, fingerlike to threadlike fleshy leaves up to 13 centimeters long. The inflorescence is a bundle of short stems a few centimeters tall each bearing a flower. The flower has 5 to 10 shiny white to pale pink petals each 1 to 2 centimeters long, pointed or with blunt tips. At the center are many stamens. This is sometimes grown as an ornamental plant suitable for alpine and rock gardens.

References

External links
Jepson Manual Treatment
Southwest Colorado Wildflowers
Photo gallery

nevadensis
Flora of the Northwestern United States
Flora of California
Flora of Nevada
Flora of the Cascade Range
Flora of the Klamath Mountains
Flora of the Sierra Nevada (United States)
Plants described in 1873
Flora without expected TNC conservation status